Tainan earthquake may refer to:

1946 Tainan earthquake
2016 Tainan earthquake

See also
List of earthquakes in Taiwan